Dragovishtitsa is a village in Kyustendil Municipality, Kyustendil Province, south-western Bulgaria.

Gallery

References

Villages in Kyustendil Province